Pseudotanaidae is a family of crustaceans belonging to the order Tanaidacea. The family contains one subfamily, Pseudotanainae, which contains five genera.

Genera:
 Akanthinotanais Sieg, 1977
 Beksitanais Jakiel, Palero & Błażewicz, 2019
 Mystriocentrus Bird & Holdich, 1989
 Parapseudotanais Bird & Holdich, 1989
 Pseudotanais Sars, 1882

References

Tanaidacea